Compassionate conservation is a discipline which aims to combine the fields of conservation and animal welfare. Historically, these two fields have been considered separate and sometimes contradictory to each other. The foundational principles of compassionate conservation are: "Do No Harm; Individuals Matter; Inclusivity; Peaceful Coexistence".

Compassionate conservationists argue that the conservation movement uses the preservation of species, populations and ecosystems as a measure of success, without explicit concern given to the welfare and intrinsic value of individual animals. They argue instead, that compassion for all sentient beings should be what guides conservation actions and claim that the killing of animals in the name of conservation goals is unnecessary, as these same objectives can be achieved without killing.

Compassionate conservation has been a subject of criticism by some conservationists, who consider the discipline to be harmful to the goals of conservation.

History 
The international wildlife charity Born Free Foundation, which advocates for the well-being of individual wild animals, used the phrase "compassionate conservation" as the name for a Oxford-based symposium it hosted in 2010. The Centre for Compassionate Conservation was created, in 2013, at the University of Technology, Sydney. Ignoring Nature No More: The Case for Compassionate Conservation, a collection of essays edited by compassionate conservation advocate Marc Bekoff, was published in the same year.

In preceding years, further conferences have been held on the topic and advocates have published multiple articles in conservation journals.

Criticism 
Compassionate conservation has been called "seriously flawed" by certain conservationists, who argue that its implementation is impractical and could lead to negative outcomes for wildlife, ecosystems, humans and native biodiversity. Others argue that the "do no harm" approach goes "too far" and that put into practice, it would not necessarily lead to positive outcomes for the welfare of individual animals. Andrea S. Griffin et al. argue that compassionate conservation's focus on empathy "is subject to significant biases and that inflexible adherence to moral rules can result in a 'do nothing' approach".

See also 
 Conservation welfare
 Opposition to hunting
 Relationship between animal ethics and environmental ethics
 Wild animal suffering
 Wildlife management

References

External links 
 Compassionate Conservation
 Centre for Compassionate Conservation

Animal welfare
Environmental conservation
Environmental ethics